Lifa Ntanzi (born 13 August 2001) is a South African cricketer. He made his Twenty20 debut for KwaZulu-Natal in the 2019–20 CSA Provincial T20 Cup on 13 September 2019. He made his List A debut on 13 March 2020, for Dolphins in the 2019–20 Momentum One Day Cup. He made his first-class debut on 9  November 2020, also for Dolphins, in the 2020–21 CSA 4-Day Franchise Series.

In April 2021, Ntazni was named in the South Africa Emerging Men's squad for their six-match tour of Namibia. Later the same month, he was named in KwaZulu-Natal's squad, ahead of the 2021–22 cricket season in South Africa.

References

External links
 

2001 births
Living people
South African cricketers
Dolphins cricketers
Northerns cricketers
Place of birth missing (living people)